Spies of Lightelf is a supplement for fantasy role-playing games published by Judges Guild in 1980.

Contents
Spies of Lightelf is a campaign setting that describes the wilderness area of Lightelf. It is Wilderness Book Two of the Wilderlands Project.

Publication history
Spies of Lightelf was written by Bryan Hinnen, with a cover by Jennell Jaquays, and was published by Judges Guild in 1980 as a 48-page book with a cover sheet.

Reception
William Fawcett reviewed Spies of Lightelf in The Dragon #44.  Fawcett commented that "This release adds a good deal of detail to the Wilderlands campaign and gives insight into an otherwise minor corner of the map. This is an area that a party is likely to pass through or even possibly winter in."

Notes

References

Judges Guild fantasy role-playing game supplements
Role-playing game supplements introduced in 1980